Hiromu Fujii (29 September 1935 – 9 November 2018) was a baseball player from Japan. He was a three-time All-Star for the Hiroshima Toyo Carp.

References

1935 births
2018 deaths
Japanese baseball players
Hiroshima Carp players
Hiroshima Toyo Carp players
Place of birth missing